Josip Bujas (8 March 1930 – 8 April 1976) was a Croatian rower. He competed in the men's coxed pair event at the 1960 Summer Olympics.

References

1930 births
1976 deaths
Croatian male rowers
Olympic rowers of Yugoslavia
Rowers at the 1960 Summer Olympics
Sportspeople from Šibenik